Umbrellar Ltd. is a New Zealand privately owned Internet web hosting company headquartered in Auckland, New Zealand and incorporated in New Zealand.

Its services are utilised by small businesses, marketing agencies, web specialists, and large corporate enterprises across New Zealand, Australia and Asia.

History
The company, dating back to 1997, was formed from the amalgamation of 10 New Zealand domain name and web hosting brands including Digiweb, Web Drive & Freeparking.

Infrastructure
Umbrellar has a data-centre located in Albany Heights. One of four data-centres operated by Umbrellar.

Acquisitions 
 13 June 2012, Digiweb (now Umbrellar) announced that it would acquire Digital Network Limited, a fellow provider of hosting services and domain name management. Adrian Grant was Managing Director at the time.
 8 September 2014, Web Drive was sold to Digiweb Holdings Limited. Daniel Williams & Steve Hogg were directors of Web Drive at the time.
 2005, 2day.com acquired by Freeparking.

Ownership
PenCarrow PE owns 82.8% of Umbrellar via its holding company DWDA Holdings Limited. Smaller shareholders include 10.5% owned by DWDA LTIS Trustee Ltd, 3.9% by Aminoex Trustees & RDP Trusteed Ltd. (owned by current CFO Robert Rolls), 1.63% by Adrian Grant, 1.12% by Robin Dickie.

References

External links
 

Companies based in Auckland
Domain name registrars
Web hosting
New Zealand companies established in 1997
Computer companies established in 1997